The 1931 Miami Redskins football team was an American football team that represented Miami University as a member of the Buckeye Athletic Association (BAA) during the 1931 college football season. In its eighth and final season under head coach Chester Pittser, Miami compiled a 4–5 record (1–4 against conference opponents) and finished in fifth place out of six teams in the BAA.

Schedule

References

Miami
Miami RedHawks football seasons
Miami Redskins football